Ricardo Munguía may refer to:

Ricardo Munguía Padilla (1944–2007), Mexican footballer
Ricardo Munguía Pérez (born 1975), Mexican footballer